Sulemana Abdul Samed, also known as  Awuche, (meaning 'Let's Go' in the Hausa language), is the tallest man in Ghana. He was born in 1994 in the Northern Region of Ghana. 

Samed was diagnosed with the endocrine disorder acromegaly, which is caused by an excess of growth hormone in the body. An investigation by a BBC reporter revealed that Samed was only 7 feet 4 inches (223 cm), suggesting that the hospital at which he had been measured had made a "mistake" when other outlets reported a larger height.

He has undergone treatment for his condition. Despite his unusual height, Samed has lived a relatively normal life, attending school and being employed as a farmer and a mechanic. He has stated that he hopes to marry and have children.

Samed has received media attention for his height, which he has used to raise awareness about acromegaly and the challenges faced by people who have the condition.

References 

Biological records
Human height
People

1994 births
Living people